Franklin County High School(FCHS) is located in Rocky Mount, Virginia. Approximately 2000 students attend Franklin County High School, which was founded in 1950. Since its founding, Franklin County High School, commonly known as FCHS, has grown to the largest school in the state west of Richmond. FCHS also has West Campus, a former sewing factory, which is now the CTE center, having classes such as Collision Repair, Auto Technology, Health/Science Careers, Television Production, Plumbing, Agricultural Education, and other trade jobs.

As of the 2020-21 school year, the school had an enrollment of  2,016 students and 157.86 classroom teachers (on an FTE basis), for a student-teacher ratio of 12.77.

Today 

The school covers twenty five acres and participates in 21 Varsity level sports. The  principal of FCHS is Jon Crutchfield. 

The campus of Franklin County High School contains eight classroom buildings, three gymnasiums, two cafeterias and an alternative education building. It also includes a 400 m track, and a 6,000-seat football stadium. The swim team practices at the local YMCA. 

Franklin County High School hosts foreign exchange students (in 2007 this included students from France, Norway and Germany). 

Some students and teachers use EF Tours to travel abroad on vacation. 

The senior class of 2013 received $3.9 million in scholarships, including a Naval Academy appointment worth $450,000 and scholarships from "Ferrum College (over $1 million), Emory and Henry ($350,000) and Roanoke College ($300,000)"  among other colleges.

Special Opportunities/Programs/Offers

Roanoke Valley Governor's School 
Roanoke Valley Governor's School(RVGS) A magnet school for a select number of students who applied and have exemplary academic records. Franklin County High School(FCHS) is part of the Roanoke Valley district which RVGS pulls students from.

Eagle Tech 
Originally located on West campus(2018-2019 and 2019-2020 school years). Eagle Tech is a set of courses that follow a Project-Based Learning(PBL) based learning approach. Currently located in the Tech A building near the Ramsey building and straight across from it.

Notable alumni
Todd Bodine, NASCAR veteran.
Virgil Goode, former U.S. Congressman.
Josh Grisetti, Broadway, television and film actor. (attended but did not graduate)
Ron Hodges, former Major League Baseball player
Dwaine Board, former National League Football player, Defensive Line Coach for the Cleveland Browns
Tarell Basham, NFL Outside Linebacker for the Tennessee Titans

References

Educational institutions established in 1950
Public high schools in Virginia
Schools in Franklin County, Virginia
Rocky Mount, Virginia
1950 establishments in Virginia